An Sgùrr is a generic Scottish Gaelic word for a rocky peak. There are at least two hills called An Sgùrr in Scotland:

An Sgùrr (Eigg)
An Sgùrr (Lochcarron)